Lui is a town located in East Mundri County, Western Equatoria State, Sudán do Sur (South Sudan). Other nearby towns include Mundri, Amadi, Kediba, Lakamadi and Mideh.

The town is the headquarters of the Anglican Diocese of Lui, which originated as a Church Missionary Society Station in 1920. The diocese covers a mainly rural area of approximately 12,950 km (5,000 square miles) located just north of the equator. Central to the Diocese is the Fraser Memorial Cathedral along with a nearby Diocesan office.

External links 
 https://www.mediciconlafrica.org/en/what-we-do/in-africa/our-work-in-south-sudan/

References

Populated places in Western Equatoria